Vkhodnoy Island, is a small island in the Kara Sea. It is one of the islands of the coastal area of the Nordenskiöld Archipelago.

Geography
The Ledyanyye Islands lie  to the east.  
 
Geologically all these coastal islands are a continuation of the Nordenskiöld Archipelago which lies further north.
The sea surrounding neighbouring Nansen Island is covered with pack ice with some polynias during the long and harsh winters and there are many ice floes even in the summer.

Vkhodnoy Island belongs to the Taymyrsky Dolgano-Nenetsky District of the Krasnoyarsk Krai administrative division of Russia and is part of the Great Arctic State Nature Reserve – the largest nature reserve of Russia and one of the biggest in the world.

History
In October 1900, during Baron Eduard von Toll’s fateful last expedition, the winter quarters for Toll's ship Zarya were set nearby at Nablyudeniy Island and a scientific station was built there. Nablyudeniy is a small granite island south of Bonevi Island located in a bay that Baron Toll named Colin Archer Bay (Bukhta Kolin Archera).

See also
 List of islands of Russia

References

External links 
Military History

Islands of the Nordenskiöld Archipelago
Islands of Krasnoyarsk Krai